Callipyndax is a genus of beetles in the family Buprestidae, containing the following species:

 Callipyndax cupreiventris Waterhouse, 1887
 Callipyndax encontrario Bellamy, 1994

References

Buprestidae genera